This is a list of equipment of the Uruguayan Army (Ejército Nacional) currently in service.

Infantry

Vehicles

Artillery

Anti-tank

Air defense

References 

Military equipment of Uruguay
Uruguay